Arton may refer to:

People
Given name
Arton Zekaj, Serbian footballer of Kosovo Albanian descent

Surname
Anthony Bourne-Arton, British Conservative Party politician
Oliver Rendell Arton

Places
 Arton Mill, Belgium; a protected place, see List of protected heritage sites in Gembloux
 Arton Point, Philippines, a headland, see List of headlands of the Philippines

Other uses
18 (number), arton in Swedish

See also 
 Cheryl McArton (born 1956) Canadian swimmer